iRobot Corporation is an American technology company that designs and builds consumer robots. It was founded in 1990 by three members of MIT's Artificial Intelligence Lab, who designed robots for space exploration and military defense. The company's products include a range of autonomous home vacuum cleaners (Roomba), floor moppers (Braava), and other autonomous cleaning devices.

On August 5, 2022, Amazon announced that it plans to acquire iRobot in a deal worth US$1.7billion. The deal is currently subject to federal approval from the FTC. This was not immediately forthcoming; in September 2022, the FTC requested more data from both companies, amid concerns about Amazon's market power and the privacy implications of it gaining information about consumer floorplans.

History
iRobot was founded in 1990 by Rodney Brooks, Colin Angle, and Helen Greiner after working in MIT's Artificial Intelligence Lab.
 In 1998, the company received a DARPA research contract which led to the development of the PackBot.
 In September 2002, iRobot unveiled its home robots flagship, the Roomba, which sold a million units by 2004.
 iRobot began being traded on the NASDAQ in November 2005, under ticker symbol IRBT.
 On September 17, 2012, iRobot announced that it had acquired Evolution Robotics, manufacturer of automated floor mopper Mint.

iRobot has sold more than 30 million home robots, and has deployed more than 5,000 defense & security robots, as of 2020.

In addition to deployment as bomb-disposal units with the US military in Iraq and Afghanistan, PackBots have been used to gather data in dangerous conditions at the Fukushima Daiichi nuclear disaster site, and an iRobot Seaglider detected underwater pools of oil after the Deepwater Horizon oil spill.

iRobot has been criticized for attempting unregulated use of 6240-6740 MHz band, and asking for an FCC exemption to do so. This band is for use for the lawn mowing robot without needing to use an electronic fence as a boundary marker, instead by using radio beacons. The band falls into a band reserved for radio astronomy use, thus interfering with radio telescope observations of methanol's 6.66852 GHz emissions.

In February 2016, iRobot announced that it would sell its military robotics business to Arlington Capital Partners, in order to focus more on the consumer market.

In November 2021, iRobot announced that it had acquired Aeris Cleantec AG, a Swiss air purifier manufacturer. iRobot began selling Aeris-designed air purifiers through its own brand in 2022. 

In August 2022, Amazon agreed to buy iRobot in an all-cash deal worth $1.7billion. The deal is expected to draw antitrust scrutiny from the FTC.

Current home robots

Roomba

Roomba is an automated vacuum cleaning robot first released in 2002. Roomba is powered by a rechargeable battery, and many models are available with a docking station to which the Roomba should return to recharge at the end of its cleaning cycle. They work in conjunction with accessories that use both IR and RF.

The company intentionally allows customers to hack the robot because they want people to experiment and improve the product.  The API for the serial has been published and the serial port made easily accessible to make modifications easy to perform.

In 2015, iRobot released an updated Roomba called the Roomba 980, with a camera that maps out a room of its objects. The camera uses VSlam technology to map out a room and the objects in the room to clean the entire floor of a home. The Roomba 980 also includes Carpet boost where the suction is turned up when the Roomba sensor detects itself on carpets or rugs. This was also one of the first Roombas to include Wi-FI connectivity with app control.

In May 2022, iRobot announced the new operating system and software platform for its Roomba vacuum cleaners, iRobot OS. The company stated the move from iRobot genius to iRobot OS will aid in giving their products a deeper understanding of the user’s households and the users habits, in addition to voice commands and greater objected identification.

In October 2022, iRobot released the Roomba Combo, a Roomba j7+ that includes mopping capabilities. The robot is able to differentiate between hardwood floor and carpet; when it moves to carpet it lifts its mop to the top of the robot.

Braava

Braava is iRobot's Floor Mopping Robot, designed to work on all hard-surface floors. Braava uses disposable or microfiber cleaning cloths for damp and/or dry cleaning. The 380t model comes with a Channel 4 NorthStar Navigation Cube, which is set on a high surface and directs the robot around the area it cleans.

The design was known as the Mint until 2013. It was developed by Evolution Robotics, which was acquired by iRobot in 2012.

Create

Create is a hobby robot, released in 2007. Create offers users the possibility of changing or adapting the robot's functions through experimentation with the basic elements of robotics as well as by adding sensors, grippers, wireless connections, computers, or other hardware.

Root
Root is a robot that can help kids learn how to code. It is programmed through a tablet or smartphone. iRobot acquired Root Robotics in 2019.

In development

Terra
In recent developments, iRobot received FCC approval to move forward with their plans to commercialize a robotic lawn mower capable of using wireless localization technology. In early 2019 iRobot announced the robot is to be branded "Terra". Terra uses mapping (similar to the Roomba i7) to navigate and mow the lawn in a straight-line pattern. It uses smart beacon stakes to localize itself in the yard, and is taught a boundary by the user (where the robot should avoid going, such as a garden). Terra includes Wi-Fi capabilities and a docking station for recharging. Terra was available as a beta program in 2019 in Germany and the United States. The program was indefinitely postponed in March 2020.

Discontinued products

Scooba

Scooba was iRobot's floor-washing robot. The product became commercially available in limited quantities in late 2005 before a full product release in 2006. Early models required either a special non-bleach cleaning solution or white vinegar to wash hard floors. Newer units could use plain water. Several versions were marketed. iRobot phased out the Scooba line of products in favor of the Braava line of floor moppers in 2016.

Dirt Dog (char)
Dirt Dog was designed for workshop use and was released in 2006. This product picks up small objects such as nuts, bolts, dirt, and debris from a workshop or similar floor. The unit  was able to be used on hard floors, shop carpets and industrial floor surfaces. The Dirt Dog was discontinued in late 2010.

My Real Baby
My Real Baby was a robotic toy marketed by iRobot from 2000 and produced in partnership with the toy manufacturer Hasbro. It is no longer in production. This product, which was meant to look like a human infant, employed animatronic facial expressions and was developed from an emotionally expressive and responsive robot developed by iRobot corporation called "IT."

ConnectR
Connect R was made in 2010; unfortunately it did not pass pilot test, and therefore was never introduced to the public.

Verro

Verro was a swimming-pool cleaning robot released in April 2007.

Looj 
Looj was a gutter-cleaning robot released in September 2007, and based on an autonomous version created for a science fair project created by Lucas Garrow in 2004 (Garrow was a finalist in the 2004 The Discovery Channel Young Scientist Challenge (DCYSC)). Looj is not an autonomous robot, but rather a remote-controlled robot patterned after a toy tank with an auger mounted on the front. The robot fits inside most gutters to clean out debris stuck inside them, such as leaves and pine needles. It has long treads on its side which allow it to move inside the gutter. The auger dislodges and removes almost all of the debris inside the gutter by flinging it sideways into the air. Looj also has a detachable handle/remote that is used to carry and operate the robot. It was discontinued in 2017, but as of 2020 parts, supplies, and entire robot kits are still available on the aftermarket on sites like eBay.

Mirra
Mirra was a swimming-pool cleaning robot, the successor of Verro. Mirra cleaned a pool's floor and walls of large and small debris. It was discontinued in 2014.

Military and policing robots

In April 2016, iRobot sold off its Defense & Security unit, with a new company being formed called Endeavor Robotics. This unit became part of Teledyne FLIR in 2019.

First Generation Robots
 Genghis (1991) was iRobot's first robot. It was designed as a test platform for researchers. The robot is currently at the Smithsonian Air and Space Museum
 Ariel (1996) is a crab-like robot designed to remove mines, both in and out of water.
 Urbie (1997) was a proof of concept robot designed for urban environments. The platform was designed with two tank-like tracks so it could climb stairs. Urbie was field tested at Fort Benning, Georgia, United States; one model was gifted to a local high school on indefinite loan in 2005. High school students at Columbus High School in Columbus, GA, reconditioned the robot and created a usage manual for future students to continue to benefit from Urbie's list of talents. Urbie is built around a light, machined aluminum chassis. The exterior consists of flat aluminum plates, bent at the front and back, which are attached to the chassis with small hex screws. 2 dc motors power the forward rotating arms, while 2 slightly larger dc motors power the body length treads. From the outside, Urbie is an exact replica of the PackBot Scout. The front compartment holds 2 banks of LEDs, one white light, the other infrared. The center-front compartment holds a video camera and an infrared camera. Both cameras' images are transmitted back to a handheld LCD screen and remote control console via a single antenna. The image that is transmitted back is controlled by a mechanical switch, thrown remotely inside the chassis by a remote controlled actuator. The motors are controlled the same way that a remote control airplane or car is. The ability to reverse the tread direction on both sides gives the robot a 0 degree turn radius. In 2006, the exterior body was refinished, the antennas were repaired (replaced by a fishing pole) and some of the interior electronics were updated. The robot is simply constructed, with basic electronic controls, and is the same physical design as the current PackBots, it only lacks the digital processor.
 SWARM is an artificial intelligence research project designed to develop algorithms for swarms of hundreds of individual robots. This project is sponsored by DARPA.

PackBot

 PackBot is a series of military robots designed for situational awareness, reconnaissance, explosive ordnance disposal and other missions. As of 2009, the US military had more than 2000 PackBots that were on station in Iraq and Afghanistan.

SUGV

 iRobot's platform for the United States Army's Future Combat Systems.

Warrior

Its potential uses include bomb disposal, battlefield casualty extraction and firefighting.

R-Gator

 R-Gator, a product of a partnership with John Deere Corporation, is a small utility vehicle with a robotics package added. It is capable of autonomous operation including waypoint following with obstacle avoidance, following dismounted infantry and other vehicles and semi-autonomous operation such as teleoperation with obstacle avoidance. Vehicles are currently in production.

Negotiator

 Negotiator is a man-portable civil-response surveillance and reconnaissance robot.

Transphibian

 Transphibian is a man-portable UUV and bottom crawler that autonomously inserts itself into the water and operates in a shallow area. It is designed for mine detection, harbor defense and surveillance.

Chembot
 Chembot is a DARPA-funded prototype of a shape-shifting robot without motors, wheels or any rigid  elements. It runs on chemical power and is made using dielectric elastomers, which are extremely flexible and can alter their shape in electric or magnetic fields. Ultimately, the program aims to build a robot that is completely squishy and able to squeeze through a hole 'the size of a 10 pence coin'.

Ember
 Ember is a prototype miniature, tracked robot, weighing around 1 lb and costing so little to make that it is intended to be virtually disposable. Ember moves at walking pace, can right itself when it is turned over and is controlled by a simple touchscreen application on an Apple iPhone. Ember is a military robot designed to boost radio communications and capture video footage to aid infantry warfighters.

AIRarm
AIRarm is an inflatable arm robot developed by iRobot. The inflatable arm uses pumps to inflate the arm. Since the arm uses strings and actuators, no motors were used at the joints.

FirstLook
It has visible and thermal cameras and infrared sensors to gather and transmit images of buildings, caves, or other locations. It can participate in explosive ordnance disposal by carrying  of C4 explosive to an IED. The robot has the ability to mesh together a network of feeds from other robots to extend the range of its sensors. The FirstLook has CBRN detectors and is semi-autonomous, meaning it can perform tasks like course correction and flipping itself over without direct intervention.  100 were bought by JIEDDO in March 2012 and the Pentagon has ordered hundreds more.

Medical robots

RP-VITA
 RP-VITA, or Remote Presence Virtual + Independent Telemedicine Assistant, is a medical robot jointly produced with InTouch Health. The robot will be cloud-connected and have access to a patient's medical record, and will also be able to plug in diagnostic devices such as stethoscopes, otoscopes, and ultrasound.

Research and dual-role robots

Ranger

 Ranger is a man-portable UUV that supports technology development related to mine warfare, expeditionary warfare, homeland defense, underwater surveillance / reconnaissance and other missions. Ranger is also suitable for ocean research and commercial applications related to search and survey.

Seaglider

 Seaglider is a long-range dual-role autonomous underwater vehicle, which was produced by iRobot from 2008–2013 under an exclusive manufacturing agreement from the University of Washington. Capable of operating for months over thousands of kilometers on a single battery charge, networked Seagliders provide scientists and naval intelligence with cost-effective real-time access to oceanographic measurements. The Seaglider is also used in military applications where it is more usually designated as an unmanned underwater vehicle.

See also
 Artificial Intelligence
 Autonomous research robot
 Domestic robot
 Home automation
 List of vacuum cleaners
 Neato Robotics
 Scooba

References

External links

 
 Visit to iRobot and interview with Joe Dyer. The Sunday Times 31 May 2009, Mark Harris
 New York Times article about military robots including iRobot's packbot
 iRobot on antisniper device
 iRobot 310 SUGV
 

 
Robotics companies of the United States
Technology companies established in 1990
American companies established in 1990
Defense companies of the United States
Manufacturing companies based in Massachusetts
Technology companies based in the Boston area
Companies based in Bedford, Massachusetts
Vacuum cleaner manufacturers
Companies listed on the Nasdaq
2005 initial public offerings
Home appliance manufacturers of the United States
Announced mergers and acquisitions